Victor Van Hamme (born 1897, date of death unknown) was a Belgian weightlifter. He competed at the 1924 Summer Olympics and the 1928 Summer Olympics.

References

External links
 

1897 births
Year of death missing
Belgian male weightlifters
Olympic weightlifters of Belgium
Weightlifters at the 1924 Summer Olympics
Weightlifters at the 1928 Summer Olympics
Place of birth missing
20th-century Belgian people